Leopold "Poldi" Fellerer (7 June 1919 – 16 July 1968) was a Luftwaffe night fighter ace and recipient of the Knight's Cross of the Iron Cross during World War II.  The Knight's Cross of the Iron Cross was awarded to recognise extreme battlefield bravery or successful military leadership.

Early life and career
Fellerer, the son of a Beamter, was born on 7 June 1919 in Vienna, Austria. In 1937, he applied for service in the Austrian Air Force but was rejected and joined the Army where he served with Infanterieregiment 3. Following the Anschluss, the annexation of Austria into Nazi Germany on 12 March 1938, Fellerer applied for service in the Luftwaffe and was again rejected. As a member of Infanterieregiment 131, an infantry regiment of the 44th Infantry Division, he participated in the annexation of Sudetenland.

In November 1938, following two further applications, he was accepted for flight training. He was selected to become a bomber pilot and completed his training at a Kampffliegerschule (Combat pilot school). In April 1940, Fellerer was promoted to Leutnant (second lieutenant) and posted to the Kampffliegerschule-Ergänzungsgruppe, a supplementary training unit for bomber pilots.

World War II

Following the 1939 aerial Battle of the Heligoland Bight, bombing missions by the Royal Air Force (RAF) shifted to the cover of darkness, initiating the Defence of the Reich campaign. By mid-1940, Generalmajor (Brigadier General) Josef Kammhuber had established a night air defense system dubbed the Kammhuber Line. It consisted of a series of control sectors equipped with radars and searchlights and an associated night fighter. Each sector, named a Himmelbett (canopy bed), would direct the night fighter into visual range with target bombers. In 1941, the Luftwaffe started equipping night fighters with airborne radar such as the Lichtenstein radar. This airborne radar did not come into general use until early 1942.

Night fighting
Fellerer was posted to II. Gruppe (2nd group) of Nachtjagdgeschwader 1 (NJG 1—1st Night Fighter Wing) as Technical Officer. He claimed his first victory on 11 February 1941, a Handley Page Hampden bomber X3001 of No. 49 Squadron north of Alkmaar. He was transferred to 4. Staffel of NJG 1 in June 1941. On 16 June, his Messerschmitt Bf 110 D-0 "G9+DM" was hit by the defensive gunfire from the RAF Vickers Wellington W5447 from No. 218 Squadron. The combat took place over the North Sea west of Den Helder. Fellerer and his radio operator Oberfeldwebel Heinz Hätscher returned to Bergen airfield.

On 10 October 1942, Fellerer was made Staffelkapitän (squadron leader) of 3. Staffel of NJG 1. Due to a redesignation, this squadron became the 5. Staffel of Nachtjagdgeschwader 5 (NJG 5—5th Night Fighter Wing) on 1 December 1942. Promoted to Hauptmann, Fellerer became Gruppenkommandeur (group commander) of II. Gruppe of NJG 5 in February 1944. During this period, Fellerer raised his score to 18 victories.

In January 1944, Fellerer claimed two United States Army Air Forces (USAAF) heavy bombers in daylight- a Consolidated B-24 Liberator on 4 January, and a Boeing B-17 Flying Fortress on 11 January. On the night of 20/21 January 1944 he claimed five Royal Air Force (RAF) bombers. He was then awarded the German Cross in Gold on 5 February 1944.

After 34 victories Hauptmann Fellerer was awarded the Knight's Cross of the Iron Cross on 8 April 1944. On 10 May 1944, II. Gruppe of NJG 5 became the III. Gruppe of Nachtjagdgeschwader 6 (NJG 6—6th Night Fighter Wing), which continued to lead.

During August–October 1944, Fellerer and III./NJG 6 also flew operations to counter supply operations from Italy to the Polish Home Army uprising in Warsaw. He claimed two Douglas DC-3s and two Liberators during this time, his final aerial victory coming in October 1944.

In 450 missions Leopold Fellerer claimed 41 aerial victories, 39 of them at night. 32 were four engine heavy bombers.

Later life
During the 1950s, he served with the Austrian Air Force, becoming Commander of the Langenlebarn Airbase in Tulln on the Danube, retiring as an Oberstleutnant. Leopold Fellerer died on 15 July 1968 in an air crash, his Cessna L-19 coming down near Krems.

Summary of career

Aerial victory claims
Foreman, Parry and Mathews, authors of Luftwaffe Night Fighter Claims 1939 – 1945, researched the German Federal Archives and found records for 40 nocturnal victory claims. Mathews and Foreman also published Luftwaffe Aces — Biographies and Victory Claims, listing Fellerer with 36 claims, including one four-engined bomber by day, plus four further unconfirmed claims.

Victory claims were logged to a map-reference (PQ = Planquadrat), for example "PQ 75884". These sectors were then subdivided into 36 smaller units to give a location area 3 × 4 km in size.

Awards
 Aviator badge
 Front Flying Clasp of the Luftwaffe in Gold
 Iron Cross (1939) 2nd and 1st Class
 Honour Goblet of the Luftwaffe (Ehrenpokal der Luftwaffe) on 16 November 1942 as Oberleutnant and pilot
 German Cross in Gold on 5 February 1944 as Hauptmann in the 5./Nachtjagdgeschwader 5
 Knight's Cross of the Iron Cross on 8 April 1944 as Hauptmann and Gruppenkommandeur of the II./Nachtjagdgeschwader 5

Notes

References

Citations

Bibliography

 
 
 
 
 
 
 
 
 
 
 
 
 
 
 

1919 births
1968 deaths
Military personnel from Vienna
German World War II flying aces
Austrian military personnel of World War II
Recipients of the Gold German Cross
Recipients of the Knight's Cross of the Iron Cross
Austrian military personnel
Victims of aviation accidents or incidents in Austria
Victims of aviation accidents or incidents in 1968